FC Balkan Botevgrad is a Bulgarian football club, playing in the city of Botevgrad. The stadium of the club is "Hristo Botev" in Botevgrad with capacity of 8,000 people.

History
The club was established in 1929 with the name "Stamen Panchev". In 1945, the club was renamed "Hristo Gurbov". Since 1947, the name is "Balkan". The main kit-colours of the team are green and white. Throughout its history, the club has participated in either the second or the third Bulgarian division. Currently the team is playing in the Southwest Third League. From 2005, the chairman of the club is Tihomir Ninov. In the 2007/2008 season, Balkan finished 2nd in the Bulgarian South-West V AFG, but won promotion, because of the changes from the 2008/2009 season in Bulgaria's West and East B Groups. From 2008, the chief executive  is the famous Bulgarian footballer Marian Hristov. The club qualified at the 1/8 finals of the Bulgarian Cup 2008-09 after defeating PFC Belite orli Pleven with 2:0 and beating PFC Lokomotiv Mezdra with 1:0 to make it to the 1/8 finals of the competition. Unfortunately, "Balkan" was eliminated by CSKA Sofia after a score of 5:0.

Honours
Second League
 Fifth place (2): 1978/1979, 2008/2009

Bulgarian Cup
 1/8 finals (2): 1989, 2008

Cup of Bulgarian Amateur Football League
 Winners (1): 2019

League positions

Current squad 
As of 1 August 2019

Past seasons

External links 
 profile ad bgclubs.com
 History of PFC Balkan Botevgrad

Balkan Botevgrad
Balkan Botevgrad
1929 establishments in Bulgaria